Adesola Kazeem Adeduntan (born 7 May 1969) is a Nigerian business executive. He is the Managing Director/Chief Executive Officer of First Bank of Nigeria Limited and Subsidiaries (comprising FBN UK, FBN Congo DR, FBN Ghana, FBN Senegal, FBN Guinea, FBN Gambia, FBN Sierra Leone, FBN Mortgages, and First Pension Custodian) a position to which he was appointed from his former role as Group Chief Financial Officer and an Executive Director with the bank. He began his career with Afribank Nigeria Plc. in 1994, after which he worked with KPMG Professional Services, Citibank Nigeria, and the Africa Finance Corporation (AFC) before joining FirstBank in July 2014.

Adesola, a member of the Bretton Woods Committee, currently sits on the board of the Nigerian Economic Summit Group, and as a non-executive director on the boards of the Nigeria Interbank Settlement System Ltd. (NIBSS), Africa Finance Corporation (AFC), FBN Bank U.K. Ltd., Universal Payments Plc., and Shared Agent Network Expansion Facilities Ltd. (SANEF).

Adesola is also a Fellow of the Institute of Chartered Accountants of Nigeria.

Early life

Adesola was born in Ibadan, Oyo State. Between 1975 and 1981, he attended Ibadan Municipal Government Primary School (IMG), Adeoyo N4 for his primary education. At the Urban Day Grammar School, Old Ife Road, Ibadan, where he had his secondary schooling, Adesola was the Deputy Senior Prefect in his final year (1985/86).

He was admitted to the University of Ibadan in 1986 to study Veterinary Medicine, qualifying in 1992 as a veterinary surgeon.

Career

In 1994 Adesola joined Afribank (Nig) Plc. and was posted to the Ibadan Main Branch of the bank as a graduate trainee. He spent 18 months in this function, working in various areas of banking operations including cash management, clearing, credit risk management, and foreign operations.

Between September 1995 and May 2002 Adesola worked with Arthur Andersen Nigeria, rising to become manager in the firm’s financial services industry business. In this role, he led and managed the statutory audit of a number of leading Nigerian banks. In August 2000, he served as an instructor at the Andersen World-Wide Induction training for new hires in Eindhoven, the Netherlands. He also served as the lead instructor for the Local Office Basic Accounting Training and Induction course in 1999.

While with Arthur Andersen, Adesola qualified as a chartered accountant in 2000.

Adesola was a senior manager, financial services industry in KPMG between June 2002 and October 2004, where he co-pioneered the firms’ financial risk management advisory services. A knowledge manager, he was also a KPMG-accredited Trainer and facilitated several internal training programmes.

Adesola left KPMG in 2004 to study for a Master's degree in Business Administration at the Cranfield School of Management, where he was a British Chevening Scholar. He graduated in September 2005.

Adesola was a Senior Vice-President (General Manager) and Chief Financial Officer for Citibank Nigeria Limited, responsible for the bank’s financial and product control functions, quality assurance and operational risk management. Having joined Citibank in September 2005, Adesola was to play important roles in the recapitalisation of the bank during the banking consolidation era. Adesola left Citibank in October 2007.

In November 2007, Adesola joined the Africa Finance Corporation, as the pioneer Chief Financial Officer and Business Manager. In March 2014, he led the team that secured an A3/P2 investment grade international credit rating from Moody's Investors Service. This made the Africa Finance Corporation the second highest-rated lending financial institution in Africa.

In July 2014, Adesola was appointed an Executive Director/Group Chief Financial Officer of FirstBank, where he was responsible for the bank’s financial control, internal control and enhancement, business performance management, treasury and procurement functions.

On Monday 4 January 2016 Adesola resumed work as Managing Director of First Bank of Nigeria Limited, and its commercial banking subsidiaries (FBN UK, FBN Ghana, FBN DRC, FBN Guinea, FBN Gambia, FBN Mortgages, and First Pension Custodian Limited). He succeeded Bisi Onasanya.

On 7 December 2016 Adesola was awarded the Banker Of The Year 2016 by the Leadership (newspaper) "For refusing to 'go with the flow' even when the temptation was high and the reward substantial, and for reminding his colleagues that banking is nothing without integrity".

In March 2020, Adesola was awarded the "African Banking Personality of the Year" 2019 at the eighth African Leadership Magazine Persons of the Year award dinner. 

On April 28, 2021, Adeduntan was removed as Managing Director and Chief Executive Officer of First Bank of Nigeria by the bank’s Board of Directors. However, he was reinstated by the Governor of Central Bank of Nigeria (CBN), on April 29, a day after he was removed by the board. In the same announcement reinstating Adeduntan, the CBN governor sacked the entire board of directors of FBN Holdings Plc and its subsidiary First Bank of Nigeria Ltd citing insider abuse, insider credit and breakdown of corporate governance as the reason.

Personal life

Adesola is happily married with children.

References

1969 births
Living people
Yoruba bankers
Businesspeople from Ibadan
Nigerian bankers
Nigerian accountants
Nigerian corporate directors
Alumni of Cranfield University
University of Ibadan alumni